The Akkademja tal-Malti was the prime regulatory body responsible for the Maltese language from the early 20th century up to the end of the millennium, when a government-sponsored law was passed to protect issues related to the national language. On joining the European Union, Maltese became one of the recognised languages of the EU.

Initially known as L-Għaqda tal-Kittieba tal-Malti (Association of Writers of Maltese), Malta's oldest literary society whose earliest activities go as far back as the early 1920s, led by literary figures including Dun Karm, Ġużè Muscat Azzopardi and Ninu Cremona, it spearheaded the cause of the Maltese language. The Akkademja was mainly responsible for major linguistic and literary development of the Maltese language during the past century, developing linguistic academic initiatives which culminated in the national recognition of a standard written Maltese.

In 2005 the National Council for the Maltese Language was set up through a law by the Maltese Parliament. This council is currently the main regulatory body of the Maltese language, replacing the L-Akkademja tal-Malti.

External links
National Council for the Maltese Language website
L-Akkademja tal-Malti website

Learned societies of Malta
Language regulators
Maltese language